Plicuteria lubomirski is a species of air-breathing land snail, a terrestrial pulmonate gastropod mollusk in the family Hygromiidae, the hairy snails and their allies.

Taxonomy 
The spelling of the name is currently disputed. In the original source the name was spelled Helix (Fruticicola) Lubomirski, to be corrected to lubomirski under the ICZN Code. Later many authors spelled the name lubomirskii, but some other authors used the spelling lubomirski. The 4th edition of the Code (effective since 2000) gives no clear ruling (previous editions of the Code had a clear ruling that lubomirski was the correct form), so this case will remain disputed.

Schileyko (1978) placed this species in the subgenus Plicuteria Schileyko, 1978. However, based on molecular analyses, this species may not actually belong in the genus Trochulus.

Distribution 
This species is known to occur in:
 Ukraine

References

External links

 Trichia (Plicuteria) lubomirskii at Fauna Europaea
 Trochulus lubomirski at AnimalBase

Hygromiidae
Gastropods described in 1881
Taxobox binomials not recognized by IUCN